Ramón Gil-Casares (born October 26, 1953) is a Spanish diplomat who has served as Ambassador of Spain to the United States of America  from April 2012 to April 2017.

He joined the Spanish diplomatic service in 1982, and served from 2005 to 2008 as the Spanish Ambassador to South Africa. Since 2002 to 2004, he served as the 5th Secretary of State for Foreign Affairs of the Government of Spain. 2008-2011 he was an advisor to the Directorate General of Foreign Policy for Africa. In February 2011, he became the Ambassador to Sudan, and when South Sudan gained independence 4 months later he was also appointed as ambassador to South Sudan.

As of October 8, 2017, Ramon Gil-Casares is engaged to be married.

References

1953 births
Living people
Ambassadors of Spain to the United States
Ambassadors of Spain to Sudan
Ambassadors of Spain to South Africa
Secretaries of State for Foreign Affairs (Spain)